The kelp poacher (Agonomalus mozinoi) is a fish in the family Agonidae. It was described by Norman Joseph Wilimovsky and Donald Edward Wilson in 1979, originally under the genus Hypsagonus. It is a marine, temperate water-dwelling fish which is known from northern British Columbia, Canada to central California, USA, in the eastern Pacific Ocean. It uses its pectoral fins to climb the faces of rocks and crawl on the bottom. Its body is camouflaged by a coating of sponges and seaweed.

The kelp poacher is reported to spawn from January to May, in the United States.

References

Kelp poacher
Taxa named by Norman Joseph Wilimovsky
Taxa named by Donald Edward Wilson
Fish described in 1979